Jens Christian Grøndahl (born 9 November 1959 in Lyngby) is a Danish writer.

His novel An Altered Light was shortlisted for the 2006 International Dublin Literary Award.

In 1998 he won the Danish booksellers award De Gyldne Laurbær (The Golden Laurel) for his novel Lucca.

In 2017, Grøndahl went on the record stating that "It's never the woman's fault if a man decides to attack her. But, that said...well, when I look at the picture of the victim, the way she let herself be photographed, the look she gives the camera...I can't help but think that this is a girl who's looking for trouble." regarding the beheading of journalist Kim Wall.

Bibliography

Kvinden i midten - 1985
Syd for floden - 1986
Rejsens bevægelser - 1988
Det indre blik - 1990
Skyggen i dit sted - 1991
Dagene skilles - 1992
Stilheden i glas - 1993
Indian summer - 1994
Tavshed i oktober - 1996 (translated into English by Anne Born, Silence in October 2000)
Lucca - 1998 (translated into English under same title 2002)
Hjertelyd - 1999
Virginia - 2000 (translated into English by Anne Born under same title, 2003)
Et andet lys - 2002 (translated into English by Anne Born, An Altered Light 2005)
Piazza Bucarest - 2004 (translated into Romanian by Carmen Vioreanu, 2013)
Røde hænder - 2006
Tre skridt tilbage - 2007 (essays)
Den tid det tager -  2008
Fire dage i marts -  2009
Om en time springer træerne ud -  2010
Det gør du ikke -  2010
Før vi siger farvel - 2012
Den sibriske måne - 2013

References

Danish male writers
1959 births
Living people